All Those Born With Wings is a solo album by Norwegian saxophonist Jan Garbarek, released on the ECM label in 1987. On this recording Garbarek can be heard playing all the instruments, including keyboards, percussion, sampled guitar and voice in addition to multitracked saxophone.  The third piece is dedicated to the film director Andrey Tarkovsky

Reception 
Allmusic awarded the album with 3 stars and its review by Mark W. B. Allender states: "On the hip with most of Garbarek's recordings, this one is airy and spacy — belting out screaming sax lines. The five pieces here — serially titled — tend to blend together, giving the impression of one long song".

Track listing 
All compositions by Jan Garbarek.

 "1st Piece" – 6:09
 "2nd Piece" – 4:51
 "3rd Piece" – 7:38
 "4th Piece" – 6:34
 "5th Piece" – 12:54
 "6th Piece" – 5:09

Personnel 
 Jan Garbarek – all instruments (saxophones, keyboards, guitar, percussion, voice and other)

References 

1987 albums
ECM Records albums
Jan Garbarek albums
Albums produced by Manfred Eicher